Pyrus spinosa (syn. Pyrus amygdaliformis), the almond-leaved pear, is a species of flowering plant in the family Rosaceae, native to the northern Mediterranean region. It has white flowers which bloom in April–May. The fruits are bitter and astringent. It hybridizes easily with Pyrus communis and Pyrus pyraster.

References

spinosa
Flora of Spain
Flora of France
Flora of Corsica
Flora of Italy
Flora of Sardinia
Flora of Sicily
Flora of Yugoslavia
Flora of Albania
Flora of Bulgaria
Flora of Greece
Flora of European Turkey
Flora of Turkey
Plants described in 1775